The Pankrác Plain or Pankrác Terrace  is a geomorphological and urban area in Prague associated with the Pankrác district. The name refers to the church of St. Pancras in the area. It stands about 1.5 km from the World Heritage Site "Historic Centre of Prague", the southern horizon of the Prague panorama. The second half of the 2000s witnessed a controversy related to the construction of new skyscrapers in the area.

High rise buildings at Pankrác Plain
The whole panorama of the top of Pankrác hill is usually taken into account when assessing the Prague panorama. At present (2018) there are the following buildings, which significantly enter the long-distance views:

References

External links
 O soutěži z roku 1997 (Klub Za starou Prahu)
 Válka o Pankráckou pláň (týdeník A2)
 Další záměry výstavby výškových budov na Pankráci (estav.cz)
 UNESCO doporučuje Praze snížit plánované mrakodrapy na Pankráci (ihned.cz)

Geography of Prague
Plains of Europe
Landforms of the Czech Republic